Ojarud-e Sharqi Rural District is in Muran District of Germi County, Ardabil province, Iran. At the census of 2006, its population was 8,244 in 1,644 households; there were 6,927 inhabitants in 1,721 households at the following census of 2011; and in the most recent census of 2016, the population of the rural district was 6,164 in 1,750 households. The largest of its 39 villages was Kalansura, with 606 people.

References 

Germi County

Rural Districts of Ardabil Province

Populated places in Ardabil Province

Populated places in Germi County